The Ciclova (also: Valea Lungă) is a left tributary of the river Caraș (Karaš) in Romania. It discharges into the Caraș in Vrani.

References

Rivers of Romania
Rivers of Caraș-Severin County